The North American Aviation A-27 is an attack version of the North American T-6 Texan. Ten aircraft were ordered by Thailand as NA-69 light attack aircraft.

Instead of being delivered to Thailand, the aircraft were taken over in October 1940 by the United States Army Air Corps (USAAC) to keep them out of Japanese hands and redesignated A-27 under the USAAC aircraft designation system. Assigned to Nichols Field in the Philippines and used as a trainer, all A-27s were destroyed within a month during the Japanese invasion of that country during World War II.

Operators

United States Army Air Corps
4th Composite Group, Nichols Field, Luzon, Philippines
3rd Pursuit Squadron - 1941
17th Pursuit Squadron - 1941
20th Pursuit Squadron - 1941

Specifications (A-27)

See also

References

Bibliography
 

North American A-27
World War II ground attack aircraft of the United States
A-27
Single-engined tractor aircraft
Aircraft first flown in 1938